Two of Us or The Two of Us may refer to:

Film and television 
 The Two of Us (1930 film), a Swedish film directed by John W. Brunius
 The Two of Us (1939 film), a Swedish film directed by Schamyl Bauman
 The Two of Us (1967 film), a French film directed by Claude Berri
 The Two of Us (2015 film), a South African film directed by Ernest Nkosi
 Two of Us (1987 film), a gay-themed British television film
 Two of Us (2000 film), an American television drama about a fictionalized meeting between Paul McCartney and John Lennon
 The Two of Us (1981 TV series), a sitcom starring Peter Cook and Mimi Kennedy
 The Two of Us (1986 TV series), a British comedy starring Nicholas Lyndhurst and Janet Dibley
 The Two of Us (2009 TV series) or Tayong Dalawa, a Filipino primetime drama series
 Two of Us (2019 film), a French film

Music

Albums 
 Two of Us (Azu album)
 Two of Us (Joseph Williams album)
 Two of Us (Phil Keaggy and Mike Pachelli album)
 Two of Us (Tohoshinki album)
 The Two of Us (mixtape), by Chloe x Halle
 The Two of Us (Sonny & Cher album)
 The Two of Us (Stafford and Macrae album)
 The Two of Us (Yabrough & Peoples album)
 The Two of Us, by Dinah Washington with Brook Benton, 1960
 The Two of Us, by Nancy Wilson with Ramsey Lewis 1984 pop #144, RnB #42

Songs 
 "Two of Us" (Beatles song), by The Beatles, 1969
 "Two of Us" (Louis Tomlinson song), 2019
 "Two of Us" (Birds of Tokyo song), 2020
 "Two of Us", by Ayumi Hamasaki, a B-side of the single "Depend on You", 1998
 "Two of Us", by Girl's Day from Everyday II, 2012
 "Two of Us", by Supertramp from Crisis? What Crisis?, 1975
 "The Two of Us", by Chae Yeon, 2004
 "The Two of Us", by Jackie Trent and Tony Hatch, 1967
 "The Two of Us", by 'N Sync from Celebrity, 2001
 "The 2 of Us", by Suede from Dog Man Star, 1994

Other media 
 The Two of Us (play), a 1970 play by Michael Frayn
 The Two of Us: My Life with John Thaw, a 2004 biography by Sheila Hancock

See also 
 Just the Two of Us (disambiguation)